Ali Teoman Germaner (1934 – 23 February 2018), was a Turkish sculptor. He is also known as Aloş.

Life 
He was born in 1934 in İstanbul. Between 1949 and 1954 he was educated in the İDGSA Sculpture Department in the studios of Rudolf Belling, Zühtü Müridoğlu and Ali Hadi Bara. In 1960 he went to Paris with a scholarship from the French government. Between the years 1961 and 1965 he could be found at the École des Beaux-Arts. He studied sculpture in the studio of René Collamarini and gravür in the studio of W. S. Hayter.

In 1965 he started teaching at the  Mimar Sinan University Fine Arts Faculty sculpture department. In 1970 he became a docent, and in 1976 a professor.

After founding the academies serigrafi and gravür studio on the graphics department notable artists graduating from this studio became Alaettin Aksoy, Aydın Ayan, Hüseyin Bilgin, Gören Bulut, Gül Derman, Devrim Erbil, Güngör İblikçi, Gündüz Gönlönü, Mehmet Güler, Süleyman Saim Tekcan, Zahit Büyükişleyen, Erol Deneç, Nail Peyza, Ergin İnan, Utku Varlık, Mustafa Pilevneli, Hasan Pekmezci, Hayati Misman, Fevzi Karakoç, Hüsamettin Koçan, Atilla Atar, Ali İsmail Türemen, Kadri Özayten'in.

He died on 23 February 2018. His burial was at Nakkaştepe Cemetery.

Art 
Ali Teoman Germaners trees and bronze sculptures, unrealistic beings, hyper natural creatures, are evidence of his fantastic way of hinging. Serbest türde, özgür biçimleme yönünde, çağdaş heykel sanatımıza yeni olanaklar yaratma amacı, bu yapıtları belirleyici temel etkendir. Heykellerinde başlıca 6 figür görülmektedir: person, horse, snake, seashell, omurga ve buhurdan.

Works

Books 
 Aloşnâme, YKB Sanat Yayıncılık, 1999 (Sketches).

Awards 
 29. Devlet Resim ve Heykel Sergisi 56456

References

External links 
 Cumhuriyetimizin 75. Yılında, Ülkemizde "Heykel" Olgusuna Genel Bir Bakış
 Heykelia

1934 births
2018 deaths
Burials at Nakkaştepe Cemetery
Turkish male sculptors
Artists from Istanbul
Academic staff of Mimar Sinan Fine Arts University
Academy of Fine Arts in Istanbul alumni